Collection of June Fourth Poems: Commemorating the Tiananmen Square Protest is an anthology of poems commemorating the June Fourth protests in China (1989 Tiananmen Square protests and massacre) and published in 2007. The poems were written by victims, exiled activists and international supporters. It documents the history and cultural impact of the June Fourth movement.

Overview 

The chief editor is Pinchao Jiang, a student leader in June Fourth Event. Other editors include Wang Dan, Boli Zhang, Pokong Cheng, also student leaders; Hongbin Yuan, an organizer of the supporting teachers group from Beijing University; Xue Sheng, an organizer of the overseas supporting group; and Caitlin Anderson, a doctorate candidate of Research Center of East Asia of Princeton University.

The advisory committee include Yu Ying-shih, who is a professor at Princeton University and the winner of the life achievement in literature and social sciences Kluge Prize; Perry Link, who is the professor of Research Center of East Asia of Princeton University; Juntao Wang, who is a doctor of politics at Columbia University, and was the coordinator between the government and the student in the period of June Fourth Democratic Movement; Szeto Wah, who was the chairman of the Hong Kong Alliance in Support of Patriotic Democratic Movements of China; Hengnan Jiang, who is the director of the America Democratic Education Foubdation; Wu Chi-wai, who was the commissioner of the Bureau of Art Development, chairman of Literature Committee of Hongkang; Tseng Chien-Yuan, doctor of the Institute of National Development of National Taiwan University, and the former vice-director of Ministry of Law of Brainpower; Bob Fu, the director of the China Aid Association; Amber Jia, the majordomo of Asian market department of UnitedHealthCare Company, which is the 14th-biggest company in the USA.

The Collection produced by June Fourth Heritage & Culture Association in co-operation with Taiwan Foundation for Democracy  and the Taipei Economic and Cultural Office in Los Angeles

References

External links
Taiwan Ministry of National Defence: Chinese Communist Party is banning Collection of June Fourth Poems in large scale
Moli: all the days cannot detour June
Pinchao Jiang: The inbeing of the Chinese Communist Party is crueler than wolf, it is not qualified to rehab for the June Fourth

English references
Reporters without borders: China : Ban on anthology of poems about Tiananmen Square movement

Chinese references 
 Sound of Hope Radio: Returning Chinese Student Disappeared for having Collection of June Fourth Poems
 Radio of Center of Broadcast of Taiwan: Chinese government full-scale ban Collection of June Fourth Poems
 Radio of France International Broadcast: student leader of June Fourth of 1989 Student Movement censure Chinese government ban Collection of June Fourth Poems
 Radio of Free Asia of the United States: Chinese government extend ban of the Collection of June Fourth Poems
 The voice of American: Chinese government ban the spread of the pirate of Collection of June Fourth Poems

2007 anthologies
2007 poetry books
Chinese poetry anthologies
Books about the 1989 Tiananmen Square protests and massacre